Acoz Castle, also known as the Château Pirmez, is a château in Acoz in the municipality of Gerpinnes, Hainaut, Wallonia, Belgium.

History
In 1760 the castle came through inheritance into possession of Michel-Joseph d'Udekem de Guertechin (1684-1761). It was owned by d'Udekem d'Acoz family until 1860, when the château was sold to the Pirmez family. During the 19th century it was the home of Belgian author Octave Pirmez.

See also
List of castles in Belgium

External links
Château d’Acoz Castles of Hainault

Castles in Belgium
Castles in Hainaut (province)